Jennifer McKelvie ( Gray; born 1977) is a Canadian politician and geoscientist who has served as the deputy mayor of Toronto since November 16, 2022. McKelvie has represented Ward 25 Scarborough—Rouge Park on the Toronto City Council since 2018. As the deputy mayor, McKelvie assumed certain mayoral powers upon the resignation of Mayor John Tory on February 17, 2023, pending the election of the next mayor.  

McKelvie was one of only two candidates to unseat an incumbent in the 2018 municipal election, a rare feat in Toronto politics. In the 2014 Toronto municipal election, she was a candidate in the now defunct Ward 44, and came within less than 600 votes of defeating then long-time incumbent Ron Moeser.

Early life and family
Jennifer McKelvie ( Gray) was born in 1977 in East York, and lived her early years in an apartment complex on the North York-Scarborough border. She attended the French immersion program at the Precious Blood Elementary School of the Toronto Catholic District School Board, and is a graduate of Senator O'Connor College School.

She lives in Ward 25 with her husband, and her two children.

Academic career 
An environmental geoscientist, she received her Bachelor of Science in Environmental Science from the University of Toronto Scarborough and her Master of Science and Doctor of Philosophy from the University of Toronto in geology, with research specializing in geochemistry, environmental remediation, and biochemistry. Her academic mentor and supervisor was Barbara Sherwood Lollar.

McKelvie's academic work has been recognized and supported by the L’Oréal UNESCO Women in Science Fellowship, and the Natural Sciences and Engineering Research Council of Canada. She has co-authored more than twenty peer-reviewed scientific journal publications, which have been referenced more than 1200 times. Prior to her election, McKelvie worked as an environmental geoscientist and researcher. For almost a decade, she served as a senior scientist at the Nuclear Waste Management Organization, and as a research director at the Canadian Institute for Advanced Research. She is registered as a Professional Geoscientist (P. Geo) with the Association of Professional Geoscientists of Ontario.

Community service 
McKelvie was the first president of the Scarborough Community Renewal Organization, and was president of the Centennial Community & Recreation Association. In both of these capacities she fought for renewal and investment in Scarborough. McKelvie also served as a member of the University of Toronto Scarborough Campus Council, and as a citizen member of the Toronto and Region Conservation Authority (TRCA).

Her community service has been recognized by the Scarborough Rotary Clubs, who awarded her with the Paul Harris Fellow award in 2017. She has also received awards recognizing her leadership from the province of Ontario and was named a 150 Neighbour by the University of Toronto Scarborough.

Political career 
McKelvie currently serves as Chair of Toronto's Infrastructure and Environment Committee and as Vice-Chair of the Executive Committee. She also serves on Scarborough's Community Council, the Toronto Hydro Corporation Board of Directors and the Toronto Zoo Board of Management.

Enhancing public transit, protecting the environment and creating employment opportunities in Scarborough, were her key electoral priorities. She also derided the post-amalgamation shift of public investment and municipal jobs out of Scarborough to Toronto's downtown core.

Following the resignation of John Tory on February 17, 2023, McKelvie assumed certain powers of the mayor of Toronto until the 2023 mayoral by-election. She does not become the "acting" or "interim" mayor.

Electoral record

References 

21st-century Canadian geologists
Canadian women geologists
Environmental scientists
Toronto city councillors
Women in Ontario politics
Women municipal councillors in Canada
Living people
1977 births
Politicians from Toronto
21st-century Canadian politicians
21st-century Canadian women politicians